Andrea Ciccione (1388–1455), also known as Andrea di Onofrio, Nofri, and da Firenze, was an Italian architect and sculptor of the Renaissance. He was born and died in Florence, but spent much of his career in Naples.

He trained under Masuccio the Younger. He completed the tomb of King Ladislaus of Naples at San Giovanni a Carbonara in Naples.

References

1388 births
1455 deaths
15th-century Italian architects
Italian Renaissance architects
Architects from Naples
15th-century Italian sculptors
Italian male sculptors
Renaissance sculptors